Clanis euroa is a species of moth of the  family Sphingidae. It is known from Timor in Indonesia.

References

Clanis
Moths described in 1903
Insects of Timor